The word FCM may refer to:

Science and technology
 FCM (chemotherapy), a chemotherapy regimen
 Flow cytometry
 Food contact materials
 Fuel-containing material
 Flight control module, a computer that assists in the control of an aircraft

Computing
 Firebase Cloud Messaging
 Flash cache module
 FlashCopy Manager
 Flash Core Module
 Fuzzy C-means clustering, an algorithm
 Fuzzy cognitive map

Organizations
 Federation of Canadian Municipalities
 First Congregational Methodist Church, a Christian denomination
 Florida Citrus Mutual, an American trade group
 Friends of Cathedral Music, a British organisation
 Mexican Railway
 , a French shipbuilder

Sport
 1. FC Magdeburg, a German football club
 FC Metz, a French football club
 FC Midtjylland, a Danish football club
 FC Mulhouse, a French football club
 Moldavian Cycling Federation

Other uses
 Futures commission merchant
 Flying Cloud Airport (IATA and LID codes), in Eden Prairie, Minnesota, US
 Food Chain Magnate, 2015 strategy board game